An elm is a tree of the Genus Ulmus.

Elm or ELM may also refer to:

Places

Canada
 Elm Tree, Ontario

Germany
 Elm (hills)

Switzerland
 Elm, Switzerland, a village in the Canton of Glarus

United Kingdom
 Elm, Cambridgeshire, a village in Cambridgeshire, England

United States
 Elm, Missouri, an unincorporated community
 Elm, Pennsylvania, an unincorporated community
 Elm Township, Gage County, Nebraska, a township

Science and technology
 Edge-localized mode
 Elaboration likelihood model
 Eukaryotic Linear Motif resource, a database on patterns in protein sequences
 Export Land Model, a model for the decline of a country's oil exports
 Extended Lunar Modules, in the Apollo program

Computing
 Elm (email client)
 Elm (programming language)
 European Logarithmic Microprocessor
Extreme learning machine

People
 Christina Elm (born 1995), Danish handball player
 David Elm (footballer) (b. 1983), Swedish footballer
 Rasmus Elm (b. 1988), Swedish footballer
 Steven Elm (b. 1975), Canadian speed skater
 Viktor Elm (b. 1985), Swedish footballer
 Professor Elm, a fictional character in the Pokémon franchise

Other uses
 Elm (album), an album by jazz pianist Richard Beirach
 East London Mosque, in London, England
 Eleme language
 Elmira Corning Regional Airport, in New York
 Elms College, in Chicopee, Massachusetts

See also
 EL/M-2084, an Israeli ground-based radar system
 EL/M-2238 STAR, an Israeli naval radar system
 The Elms (disambiguation)
 Elm Creek (disambiguation)
 Elm River (disambiguation)
 Elm Street (disambiguation)